Le Socialiste picard was a socialist weekly newspaper published from Amiens, France. It was founded in 1933 as served as the organ for the Somme Federation of the Socialist Party of France. Louis Lebel, member of parliament, was the director of the newspaper.

References

1933 establishments in France
Defunct newspapers published in France
Defunct weekly newspapers
French Section of the Workers' International
Mass media in Amiens
Publications established in 1933
Publications with year of disestablishment missing
Socialist newspapers
Weekly newspapers published in France